Hoa Lư is a district of Ninh Bình province in the Red River Delta region of Vietnam. Before 1010, Hoa Lư served as the capital of Đại Cồ Việt. The ancient capital of Hoa Lư is located in Trường Yên Commune (vi). It comprises 10 communes and one township: Trường Yên, Ninh Hòa, Ninh Giang, Ninh Mỹ, Ninh Khang, Ninh Xuân, Ninh Vân, Ninh Hải, Ninh An, Ninh Thắng and Thiên Tôn Township. As of 2003 the district had a population of 66,932. The district covers an area of 103 km². The district capital lies at Thiên Tôn.

Gallery

See also
List of historical capitals of Vietnam

References

External links

 Hoa Lu Ancient Capital

Districts of Ninh Bình province